Terrah Jerrod Mustaf (born October 28, 1969) is a retired American professional basketball player.

Mustaf played at DeMatha High School in Hyattsville, Maryland. He was one of the most heavily recruited players in his senior year, and went on to play collegiately at the University of Maryland.

After being selected by the New York Knicks in the first round, 17th overall, in the 1990 NBA Draft, Mustaf played in the NBA from 1990 to 1994 with the Knicks and the Phoenix Suns, and then three days for the Seattle SuperSonics, after which he played professionally in Europe. He retired in 2001, last playing with Altay Kartal Makarna of the Turkish Basketball League.

Mustaf is the chief executive officer and president of Street Basketball Association based in Mitchellville, Maryland. He is the former sports ambassador for Gambia, professional NBA Blogger for Supersport/Multivision, Executive Director of the Take Charge Juvenile Diversion Program and Founder/Head basketball coach of the Take Charge Pride AAU Organization. He was also a three-time Parade All American (along with Shawn Kemp and Alonzo Mourning). He participated in the Capital Classic and McDonald's All-Star Games.

References

External links
College & NBA stats @ basketballreference.com
Jerrod Mustaf profile @ streetbasketballassociation.net
Jerrod Mustaf agent page @ eurobasket.com
Jerrod Mustaf arrives in Gambia @ observer.gm

1969 births
Living people
African-American basketball players
American expatriate basketball people in France
American expatriate basketball people in Greece
American expatriate basketball people in Poland
American expatriate basketball people in Spain
American expatriate basketball people in Turkey
American men's basketball players
Asseco Gdynia players
Basketball players from North Carolina
BC Andorra players
Expatriate basketball people in Andorra
American expatriate basketball people in Andorra
DeMatha Catholic High School alumni
FC Barcelona Bàsquet players
Liga ACB players
Maryland Terrapins men's basketball players
McDonald's High School All-Americans
New York Knicks draft picks
New York Knicks players
Greek Basket League players
P.A.O.K. BC players
Parade High School All-Americans (boys' basketball)
People from Whiteville, North Carolina
Phoenix Suns players
Power forwards (basketball)
SIG Basket players
21st-century African-American people
20th-century African-American sportspeople